Carl Christian Nicolaj Balle   (1806–1855) was a Danish composer and editor of church music; he is noted for his Christmas compositions, including the hymn tune "Det kimer nu til julefest".  He was born in Copenhagen, and served as a pastor in Vesterbølle and Nebsager.

References

This article was initially translated from the Danish Wikipedia.

Male composers
Danish classical organists
Male classical organists
1806 births
1855 deaths
19th-century Danish composers
19th-century Danish male musicians
19th-century organists